This page contains a list of the remaining steam locomotives in Hungary.

History 
Steam locomotives have been used in Hungary since the 1840s. Many types of early specimens have not survived. In the 20th century, more attention was paid to conscious preservation, and 1-1 specimens were exhibited in some museums or railway stations. Nevertheless, it was not until 2000 that the Hungarian Railway History Park opened in Budapest, which specifically allowed the presentation of locomotives (including many steam locomotives).

Although not all types of diesel and electric locomotives (no longer in use today) have been preserved, most of them are visible specimens. This is not the case for steam locomotives used in Hungary.

Of all the (approximately) 140 types, according to József Soltész, a train expert at the Museum of Transport (2009), "ten thousand steam locomotives have been in operation in the country, of which one hundred and fifty have survived." Of these, only 25 are operational. As the central database is not known about the locomotives found in Hungary, this list is of course not complete.

Railway Main Workshop in Istvántelek

Hungarian Railway History Park

Elsewhere

242

275

324

326

332

375

376

377

381

411

424

485

4 BHÉV

Unknown types

Steam locomotives for narrow gauge railways

References

Other articles 
 List of Hungarian locomotives

Railway locomotive-related lists
Locomotives of Hungary